Qaleh Juq or Qalah Juq or Ghaleh Joogh or Qaleh Jaq or Qaleh Joq or Qaleh Jokh or Qaleh Jogh, Qaleh Jukh, Qaleh-ye Joq or Qaleh-ye Juq or Ghaleh Jogh may refer to:

Ardabil Province
 Qaleh Juq, Kowsar, Ardabil Province
 Qaleh Juq, Nir, Ardabil Province
 Qaleh Juq-e Sabalan, Ardabil Province

East Azerbaijan Province
 Qaleh Juq, Ahar, East Azerbaijan Province
 Qaleh Juq, Hashtrud, East Azerbaijan Province
 Qaleh Juq, Malekan, East Azerbaijan Province
 Qaleh Juq, Meyaneh, East Azerbaijan Province
 Qaleh Juq, Sarab, East Azerbaijan Province
 Qaleh Juq-e Olya, East Azerbaijan Province
 Qaleh Juq-e Sofla, East Azerbaijan Province

Hamadan Province
 Qaleh Juq, Hamadan
 Qaleh Juq, Razan, Hamadan Province

Ilam Province
 Qaleh Juq, Ilam

Kurdistan Province
 Qaleh Juq, Kurdistan, a village in Sanandaj County

Kermanshah Province
 Qaleh Juq, Kermanshah

North Khorasan Province
 Qaleh Juq-e Bozorg
 Qaleh Juq-e Kuchak
 Shahrak-e Qaleh Juq-e Bozorg

Qazvin Province
 Qaleh Juq, Qazvin

Razavi Khorasan Province
 Qaleh Juq, Razavi Khorasan

West Azerbaijan Province
 Qaleh Juq, Maku, West Azerbaijan Province
 Qaleh Juq, Bazargan, Maku County, West Azerbaijan Province
 Qaleh Juq, Naqadeh, West Azerbaijan Province
 Qaleh Juq, Poldasht, West Azerbaijan Province
 Qaleh Juq, Takab, West Azerbaijan Province
 Qaleh Juq, Urmia, West Azerbaijan Province

Zanjan Province
 Qaleh Juq, Khodabandeh, Zanjan Province
 Qaleh Juq, Mahneshan, Zanjan Province
 Qaleh Juq, Tarom, Zanjan Province
 Qaleh Juq-e Sadat, Zanjan Province
 Qaleh Juq-e Siah Mansur, Zanjan Province
 Qaleh Juq Rural District, in Zanjan Province

See also
 Qaleh Jiq (disambiguation)